"Light Sings" is a song written by Will Holt and Gary William Friedman and performed by The 5th Dimension.  It reached #12 on the U.S. adult contemporary chart, #15 on the Canadian adult contemporary chart, #22 on the Canadian pop chart, and #44 on the Billboard Hot 100 in 1971.  It was featured on their 1971 album, Love's Lines, Angles and Rhymes.

The song was produced by Bones Howe and arranged by Bob Alcivar.

In media
The song was featured in the 1970 musical, The Me Nobody Knows.

References

1970 songs
1971 singles
The 5th Dimension songs
Song recordings produced by Bones Howe
Bell Records singles
Songs from musicals